This is a list of the Turkey national football team results from 1961 to 1980.

1961

1962

1963

1964

1965

1966

1967

1968

1969

1970

1971

1972

1973

1974

1975

1976

1977

1978

1979

1980

Other unofficial games

Notes

Turkey national football team results